We Are One: A Global Film Festival is an international online film festival which took place in 2020. Organized by Tribeca Enterprises in conjunction with YouTube as a response to the cancellation of many traditional film festivals during the COVID-19 pandemic, the festival screened a selection of films for free on YouTube between May 29 and June 7.

The festival featured a mix of premieres of new films that had been slated to premiere at a film festival that was cancelled due to the pandemic, and older films which the partner festivals chose to highlight as deserving of wider attention, as well as a new film by Kōji Fukada that was created specifically for We Are One. In addition, the festival screened a number of virtual reality projects and some international television and web series episodes, selected panel discussions with filmmakers, and a live DJ set by Questlove.

Films were screened for free, although links were available to encourage voluntary donations to international COVID-19 relief funds.

Partners
The event featured programming curated by various international partner festivals:

Films

Feature films
45 Days in Harvar — César Aréchiga
Adela Has Not Had Supper Yet — Oldřich Lipský
Air Conditioner — Fradique
Amreeka — Cherien Dabis
Beautiful Things — Giorgio Ferrero
Beyond the Mountain — David R. Romay
Bridges of Sarajevo — Aida Begić, Leonardo Di Costanzo, Jean-Luc Godard, Kamen Kalev, Isild Le Besco, Sergei Loznitsa, Vincenzo Marra, Ursula Meier, Vladimir Perišić, Cristi Puiu, Marc Recha, Angela Schanelec, Teresa Villaverde
A City Called Macau — Li Shaohong
Copwatch — Camilla Hall
Crazy World — Isaac Nabwana
Dantza — Telmo Esnal
Eeb Allay Ooo! — Prateek Vats
Electric Swan — Konstantina Kotzamani
The Epic of Everest — John Baptist Lucius Noel
Grab — Billy Luther
Ice Cream and the Sound of Raindrops — Daigo Matsui
The Iron Hammer — Joan Chen
Kmêdeus — Nuno Miranda
Late Marriage — Dover Kosashvili
Los Pasos Dobles — Isaki Lacuesta
Love Chapter 2 — Sharon Eyal
Mary Is Happy, Mary Is Happy — Nawapol Thamrongrattanarit
Mugaritz Bso — Juantxo Sardón, Felipe Ugarte
Mystery Road - Ivan Sen
Nasir — Arun Karthick
Ricky Powell: The Individualist — Josh Swade
Rudeboy: The Story of Trojan Records — Nicolas Jack Davies
SEE Factory Sarajevo mon amour — Dusan Kasalica, Neven Samardzic, Masa Sarovic, Urška Djukić, Eleonora Veninova, Sharon Engelhart, Teodora Ana Mihai, Gabriel Tzafka, Carolina Markowicz, Yona Rozenkier
Shiraz: A Romance of India — Franz Osten
Sisterhood — Tracy Choi
Ticket of No Return — Ulrike Ottinger
Tremble All You Want — Akiko Ohku
Volubilis — Faouzi Bensaïdi
Wake Up: Stories From the Frontlines of Suicide Prevention — Nate Townsend
Wrath of Silence — Yukun Xin

Short films
24 Frames per Century — Athina Rachel Tsangari
32-RBIT — Victor Orozco Ramírez
And Then the Bear — Agnès Patron
Anna — Dekel Berenson
Atlantiques — Mati Diop
Awake — Atul Mongia
The Battle of San Romano — Georges Schwizgebel
Bilby — Liron Topaz, Pierre Perifel, JP Sans
Bird Karma — William Salazar
Black Barbie — Comfort Arthur
Blood Rider — Jon Kasbe
Bonifacio in Summertime — Pierre-Luc Granjon, Antoine Lanciaux
The Brat — Shaan Vyas
Butterflies — Yona Rozenkier
The Cats — Alejandro Ríos
Cerulia — Sofía Carrillo
Circus Person — Britt Lower
Cru — David Oesch
Dew Line — Joanna Priestley
Dirty Laundry — Maxim Bessmertny
The Distance Between Us and the Sky — Vasilis Kekatos
Dramatic Relationships — Dustin Guy Defa
East of Jefferson — Koji Fukada
Egg — Michael J. Goldberg
Fainting Spells — Sky Hopinka
Forever's Gonna Start Tonight — Eliza Hittman
Genius Party: Happy Machine — Masaaki Yuasa
A Hand in Two Ways (Fisted) — Dani and Sheilah ReStack
Inabe — Koji Fukada
Indefinite Pitch — James N. Kienitz Wilkins
The Jump — Vanessa Dumont, Nicolas Davenel
Leon in Wintertime — Pierre-Luc Granjon, Pascal Le Nôtre
The Light Side — Ryan Ebner
Live to Live — Laida Lertxundi
Lonely Encounter — Jenny Wan
Mad Ladders — Michael Robinson
Marooned — Andrew Erekson
Masterpiece — Runyararo Mapfumo
Molly in Springtime — Pierre-Luc Granjon
Monster God — Agustina San Martin
Motorcycle Drive By — David Wexler
Mud — Shaandiin Tome
My Father's Tools — Heather Condo
Natkhat — Shaan Vyas
The Nap — Federico Luis Tachella
No More Wings — Abraham Adeyemi
No One Left Behind — Guillermo Arriaga
Nutag-Homeland — Alisi Telengut
Occidente — Ana Vaz
The One-Minute Memoir — Joan C. Gratz
Over — Jörn Threlfall
Parsi — Eduardo Williams, Mariano Blatt
Pelourinho: They Don't Really Care About Us — Akosua Adoma Owusu
Poppety in the Fall — Pierre-Luc Granjon, Antoine Lanciaux
The Procession (Le Cortège) — Pascal Blanchet, Rodolphe Saint-Gelais
Rosalinda — Matías Piñeiro
Route-3 — Thanasis Neofotistos
Service of the Goods — Jean-Paul Kelly
Shannon Amen — Chris Dainty
Stories of Destroyed Cities: Şhengal — Şêro Hindê
Toto — Marco Baldonado
Tapi! — Jim Chuchu
The Tear's Thing — Clémence Poésy
Throat Singing in Kangirsuk — Eva Kaukai, Manon Chamberland
Untitled (Letter to Serra) — Lisandro Alonso
The Van — Erenik Beqiri
Vertical Shapes in a Horizontal Landscape — Mark Jenkin
Violettina — Alice Rohrwacher
When I Write It — Nico Opper, Shannon St. Aubin
White Echo — Chloë Sevigny
Who Talks — Elin Övergaard
The Yalta Conference Online — Koji Fukada

360 VR
Alteration — Jérôme Blanquet
Bloodless — Gina Kim
Crow: The Legend — Eric Darnell
Daughters of Chibok — Joel Kachi Benson
Extravaganza — Ethan Shaftel
Ghost Fleet VR — Lucas Gath and Shannon Service
Isle of the Dead — Benjamin Nuel
Ivory Burn — Nicholas de Pencier, Jennifer Baichwal and Edward Burtynsky
Minotaur — Munro Ferguson
My Africa — David Allen
On/Off — Isabelle Foucrier and Camille Duvelleroy
Passenger — Isobel Knowles and Van Sowerwine
Step to the Line — Ricardo Laganaro
Traveling While Black — Roger Ross Williams
The Waiting Room — Victoria Mapplebeck

Television
And She Could Be Next — Grace Lee, Marjan Safinia
Losing Alice — Sigal Avin
Mabo — Rachel Perkins
Na plovarne — Marek Eben

Web series
Jaws: Assembling a Top-Tier Team — Michael Tucker, Tricia Aurand, Brian Bitner, Alex Calleros, Vince Major
The Stories That Prepared Us — Jack Nugent, Andrew Fernandez
Sébastien Tellier on Paris’ Rooftop: A Take Away Show — Élie Girard

Panels
Sundance Film Festival: Cinema Cafe with Jackie Chan
Sundance Film Festival: Cinema Cafe with Tessa Thompson and Jane Campion
Guadalajara International Film Festival: Diego Luna, The Life After
Rotterdam International Film Festival Freedom Lecture: Rojava Film Commune
Marrakech International Film Festival: In conversation with Guillermo del Toro
Locarno International Film Festival 2019 Excellence Award Conversation: Song Kang-ho and Bong Joon-ho
Locarno International Film Festival 2019 Pardo d'onore to John Waters
Jerusalem Film Festival Masterclass with Nadav Lapid
Berlin International Film Festival On Transmission: Ang Lee in Conversation with Kore-eda Hirokazu
Berlin International Film Festival On Transmission: Claire Denis in Conversation with Olivier Assayas
Cannes Film Festival Rendez-vous with Alain Delon
Cannes Film Festival Rendez-vous with Zhang Ziyi
Toronto International Film Festival Talks: Tantoo Cardinal Master Class
Toronto International Film Festival Talks: Viggo Mortensen and David Cronenberg on Crash
Tribeca Film Festival Talks: Alejandro Iñárritu with Marina Abramović
Tribeca Film Festival Talks: Francis Ford Coppola and Steven Soderbergh

References

External links

2020 film festivals
Internet film festivals
Cultural responses to the COVID-19 pandemic
Impact of the COVID-19 pandemic on cinema